The 1946 season was Wisła Krakóws 38th year as a club.

Friendlies

Mixed teams

A Klasa - Kraków - Qualifying round

A Klasa - Kraków

Group stage

Final round

Polish Football Championship

Squad, appearances and goals

|-
|}

Goalscorers

External links
1946 Wisła Kraków season at historiawisly.pl

Wisła Kraków seasons
Association football clubs 1946 season
Wisla